James Bright Adusei Abankwah (born 16 January 2004) is an Irish professional footballer who plays as a defender for Serie A club Udinese, having joined in January 2022 from League of Ireland Premier Division club St Patrick's Athletic, the club where he started his career.

Club career

Early career
Abankwah was born in Waterford, where he lived with his family before moving to Celbridge, then to Lucan before moving to Letterkenny where he began playing football with local side Letterkenny Rovers in 2011. He later moved to Longford with his family, where he played for local club Melview FC, where he also represented Longford at the prestigious Kennedy Cup youth tournament at Under-14 level in 2016, before the family moved again, returning to Lucan in Ireland's capital, Dublin. While still living in Longford, Abankwah signed for top Dublin schoolboy club Cherry Orchard, travelling to Dublin training by lifts from his parents and occasionally by bus, aged 12. It was there where his performances attracted the interest of scouts from local League of Ireland club St Patrick's Athletic who signed Abankwah for their Under-15 team in January 2019, aged 14. On 24 October 2019, Abankwah was part of the side that won the Under-15 League of Ireland title, as they defeated rivals Shamrock Rovers 2–1 at Tallaght Stadium to claim the trophy. A month later they defeated the same opposition in the Under-15 Cup final on penalties at Richmond Park to win the double. In 2020, he was promoted straight to the Under-19 team, three years above his age group, where on 22 December 2020, he was part of the team that won the League of Ireland U19 Division Final, beating rivals Bohemians 2–1 after extra time at the UCD Bowl to secure a UEFA Youth League spot for the club.

St Patrick's Athletic

2021 season
On 7 July 2021, Abankwah signed his first professional contract at League of Ireland Premier Division side St Patrick's Athletic, having impressed for the club's academy teams. He made his senior debut just 2 days later aged just 17 when he came off the bench for Alfie Lewis in the 62nd minute of a 1–0 win over Derry City. His first start for the club was on 3 September 2021, a 3–2 win over Longford Town. On 28 November 2021, he became the youngest ever player to appear in an FAI Cup Final at 17 years old when he replaced Paddy Barrett in the 80th minute of the 2021 FAI Cup Final, as his side defeated rivals Bohemians 4–3 on penalties following a 1–1 draw after extra time in front of a record FAI Cup Final crowd of 37,126 at the Aviva Stadium. He made a total of 13 appearances in all competitions during the 2021 season, his first in senior football.

2022 season
On 25 January 2022, it was announced that the club had sold Abankwah to Italian Serie A side Udinese for an undisclosed fee believed to a record fee paid for a League of Ireland player, believed to be in the region of €800,000 plus add ons. As part of the transfer, he was loaned back to St Patrick's Athletic until 30 June 2022, in order to allow him complete his Leaving Certificate exams at his school, Adamstown Community College, alongside playing for the club. Before the season started, manager Tim Clancy stated that there were no ‘no limitations’ set out by Udinese on Abankwah's playing time, while he also mentioned ‘It’ll be a pleasure to work with him’ during his loan.

On 11 February 2022, Abankwah was in the starting XI in the 2022 President of Ireland's Cup against Shamrock Rovers at Tallaght Stadium, eventually being replaced by Tom Grivosti in the 76th minute due to an injury, as his side lost 5–4 on penalties after a 1–1 draw. On 18 February 2022, in the opening league game of the season away to Dublin rivals Shelbourne, Abankwah played his first full 90 minutes of his senior career with his performance in the 3–0 win at Tolka Park drawing comparisons in his playing style to that of former St Patrick's Athletic and Manchester United defender Paul McGrath.

Udinese
On 25 January 2022, it was announced that Abankwah had signed for Serie A club Udinese on a four-and-a-half year contract. Ahead of joining up with the team in the summer of 2022, Abankwah revealed that he was taking Italian language lessons twice a week. Abankwah made his unofficial debut for the club on 13 July 2022, playing the second half of an 11–0 friendly win over Rapid Lienz. On 20 July 2022, it was announced that Abankwah's squad number would be the number 14.

International career

Under 15 & 16
As well as the Republic of Ireland, his country of birth, Abankwah is also eligible to represent Ghana at international level due to his parents being from there. Abankwah received his first callup to the Republic of Ireland U15 squad in January 2019, but did not feature in any of the 3 friendly games during the trip to Spain. His first international appearances came for the Republic of Ireland U16 team against Denmark U16 and England U16 in August 2019.In October 2019, he was included in the Republic of Ireland U16 squad for the following month's Victory Shield tournament played in Wales. He featured against Scotland U16 and Northern Ireland U16 at the tournament.

Under 18 & 19
He was named as captain of the Under-18 side by manager Colin O'Brien in November 2021 for a 0–0 draw with Malta U18 in a friendly. He made his first Republic of Ireland U19 appearances on 8 & 11 October 2021, playing in both a 2–2 and a 1–1 draw with Sweden U19 in two friendlies. He started all three of the team's 2022 UEFA European Under-19 Championship qualification matches on their November 2021 trip to Bulgaria, featuring against Montenegro U19, Bosnia and Herzegovina U19 and Bulgaria U19, helping his team to qualify for the Elite Phase. Abankwah's first goal at international level came on 23 March 2022, scoring an equaliser in an eventual 3–1 defeat away to England U19 at Bescot Stadium in Walsall.

Career statistics

Honours
St Patrick's Athletic
FAI Cup: 2021

References

2004 births
Living people
Association footballers from County Waterford
Republic of Ireland association footballers
Republic of Ireland youth international footballers
St Patrick's Athletic F.C. players
Udinese Calcio players
League of Ireland players
Serie A players
Association football defenders
Republic of Ireland expatriate association footballers
Irish expatriate sportspeople in Italy
Expatriate footballers in Italy
Black Irish sportspeople
Irish people of Ghanaian descent
Irish sportspeople of African descent